Michael von Graffenried (born 1957) is a Swiss photographer living and working between Paris, Brooklyn NY and Switzerland.

He started working as a photojournalist in 1978, travelling the world for numerous publications. Today he works on long-term projects using different kinds of media to showcase his artwork, such as open-air campaigns on public billboards and films. His work has appeared in numerous international magazines and newspapers, including The New York Times, Time, Newsweek, Life, Paris Match, Le Monde, GEO, Stern and El Pais. With his films, videos, photos, and also as a guest, he has contributed to many television programs in Europe. He has exhibited widely in Switzerland and France, as well as in New York City, Algiers, Hong Kong and Beirut.

Life and work

He first became known in Switzerland for work focused on his hometown, including the Swiss Parliament, where his pictures of members of parliament looking sleepy, or caught in unflattering poses, assured him a reputation for insolence. The American photography critic Vicki Goldberg wrote about his use of humor in The New York Times and drew comparisons with Robert Frank and René Burri.

It was his work on Algeria, which made his reputation internationally. For ten years, he regularly traveled the country, which was plagued by civil war, and took pictures with an old panoramic camera held at waist height, operating it without using the viewfinder. His panoramic work, which has become his signature, has been the subject of several books and an exhibition at La Villette in Paris in 1998, before being presented in Algiers in 2000. He also produced the movie War Without Images – Algeria, I Know That You Know, with the director Mohammed Soudani. The documentary film sees him go in search of Algerians he had photographed during the civil war. In 2002, the film was presented at the Locarno International Film Festival.

Von Graffenried originally worked for the printed press, where he was able to have strong control over the use of his pictures. To justify the trust placed in him by his photographic subjects and to maintain his independence and integrity, he has always refused to join a news agency or publishing company.

He then shifted to a more conceptual approach to his photography, erecting large format, panoramic versions of his work on billboards in major Swiss cities: CocaineLove on (illegal) drugs, and Eye on Africa (Cameroon). The curator and interviewer Hans-Ulrich Obrist commented on Graffenried's method of working with the old panoramic Widelux, saying that his body becomes the camera and that his photographs do not have an Inside or Outside anymore. The viewer is Immersed.

Graffenried does not hesitate to use his fame to express his political views. He was an outspoken supporter of the "NO" vote during the Swiss minaret referendum, the popular initiative approved by a majority of voters on 29 November 2009. The minaret ban is now part of the Constitution.

Between 2006 and 2021 he made a portrait of New Bern, a little town in North Carolina, USA which was founded by his ancestor Christoph von Graffenried. His series, Our Town, named after the American play by Thornton Wilder is a both a document of a community and a call for increased integration and understanding at a decisive moment in American history.

In 2014, he joined the team who created sept.info, a Swiss online news site. Here, he instigated the publication of a weekly printed magazine, cut in the exact shape of an iPad. This allowed readers to place the magazine inside their iPad, where they could then choose to either read their printed copy or the sept.info online content on screen. He was the art director of sept.info until 2015. Many of his photographer friends participated in this publishing experience.

Awards

1989 World Press Photo award, Arts and Entertainment, Stories, 3rd prize, for his series Sowjet Artists in Moscow during the Perestroika.
2006 Legion of Honour Medal awarded by the Minister of Culture (France).
2010 Dr. Erich Salomon Award awarded by the German Society for Photography.

Documentary films

2000 Algeria – War without images by Mohammed Soudani
2004 Michael von Graffenried – Photo Suisse (EN) by Andreas Hössli
2005 Cocainelove by mvg and Roland Lanz
2009 Shoreditch Stories by Peter Balzli
2009 Minaret in Bricklane London
2012 On the Edge by Mohammed Soudani
2014 mvgphoto Channel

Publications

1989 Swiss image, Bern : Benteli, 
1991 Swiss people, Le Mont-sur-Lausanne : J. Genoud, 
1995 Sudan, a forgotten war, Bern : Benteli, 
1997 Naked in Paradise, Stockport : Dewi Levis, 
1998 Inside Algeria, New York: Aperture, (Library of Congress Catalog Card Number: 98-85810)
1998 Algérie, photographies d'une guerre sans images, Paris : Hazan, 
2005 The Eye of Switzerland : 15 years of Swiss Press Photo, Wabern-Bern : Benteli, 
2005 Cocaine Love, Benteli, Wabern, 
2009 Eye on Africa, Basel, Schwabe Verlag, 
2010 Outing, Maison Européenne de la Photographie, Conversation avec Hans Ulrich Obrist à Londres
2014 Bierfest, Göttingen, Steidl, 
2016 Changing Rio, Zurich, Offizin, 
2021 Our Town, Göttingen, Steidl,

Solo exhibitions

1998 Algérie, photographies d'une guerre sans images, Paris – Month of Photography, Pavillon Delouvrier, Parc de la Villette, Paris
1999 World Panorama, Fotomuseum Winterthur, Switzerland
2000 Algérie, photographies d'une guerre sans images, National Library El Hamma, Algiers
2002 Helveticum 02, Musée d'Art et d'Histoire (Neuchâtel), Switzerland
2003 Museum of Fine Arts Bern, Switzerland (Curated by Harald Szeemann)
2003 Michael von Graffenried – World Panorama, Library of the city of Bordeaux, France
2005 Rosanna, Astrid, Peter and the others, Swiss National Museum, Zurich
2007 Inside Cairo, On the rooftop in Downtown Cairo, photography installation, Egypt
2007 Our Town, Kornhausforum Museum Bern, Switzerland
2009 Eye on Africa, Zentrum Paul Klee, Bern, Switzerland
2010 Outing, Retrospective, Maison Européenne de la Photographie, Paris
2012 Inside Cairo, Parker's Box Gallery, Brooklyn NY
2012 On the Edge (on public billboards), Varanasi, India
2014 Bierfest, Esther Wordehoff Gallery, Paris

Collections
Von Graffenried's photographs are held in the following permanent collections:
Swiss Foundation for Photography, Winterthur, Switzerland
Musée de l'Élysée, Lausanne, Switzerland
Bibliothèque nationale de France, Paris
Pilara Foundation, Pier 24 Photography, San Francisco, USA: 1 print (as of 22 October 2021)

References

External links 
 
 
 Von Graffenried talks about OurTown – Steidl video on YouTube

1957 births
Living people
Swiss photographers
Michael